18 Wheels Across America is Polish-language travel documentary produced by Discovery Channel Poland and distributed by Discovery Channel Poland and TVN, with Dawid Andres as the progremme host. It focuses on Andres's travels across the United States in his semi-trailer truck. The series had premiered on January 1, 2017, and as of 2022, has 5 seasons, with 46 episodes in total. It also had several spin-off miniseries.

Plot 
The series focuses on Dawid Andres, a truck driver and traveler, who with his semi-trailer truck transport goods across the United States, while visiting various points of interest during his travels.

Episodes

Spin-offs 
The series had four one-season spin-off miniseries.

18 Wheels Across Route 66 
18 Wheels Across Route 66 focuses on Andres's travel in his semi-trailer truck from Chicago to Los Angeles on the U.S. Route 66. It premiered in 2019 and had 7 episodes.

18 Wheels Across Vietnam 
18 Wheels Across Vietnam focuses on Andres's travel across Vietnam, in his semi-trailer truck from Hanoi, through Ho Chi Minh City, to the Mekong Delta region. It premiered in 2019 and had 9 episodes, each lasting 44 minutes.

18 Wheels Across Indonesia 
18 Wheels Across Indonesia focuses on Andres's travel in his semi-trailer truck across Indonesia. It premiered in 2019 and had 9 episodes, each lasting 42 minutes.

18 Wheels Across Africa 
18 Wheels Across Africa focuses on Andres's travel in his semi-trailer truck across Africa, with him beginning his travel in Mombasa, Kenya. It premiered in 2020 and had 9 episodes, each lasting 42 minutes.

Notes

References 

2010s Polish television series
2020s Polish television series
2017 Polish television series debuts
Discovery Channel original programming
Television shows filmed in the United States
2010s travel television series
2020s travel television series
Polish documentary television series
2010s documentary television series
2020s documentary television series